Novelle E. Francis Jr. is a politician from the United States Virgin Islands and Vice President of the Legislature of the Virgin Islands. Prior to becoming a Senator, Francis was the Police Commissioner of the United States Virgin Islands Police Department.

References

External links
 Official biography from the Legislature of the Virgin Islands

|-

|-

21st-century American politicians
Democratic Party of the Virgin Islands politicians
Living people
Senators of the Legislature of the United States Virgin Islands
Year of birth missing (living people)